Balsan may refer to:

People 
 Étienne Balsan (1878–1953), French socialite
 Humbert Balsan (1954–2005), French film producer
 Jacques Balsan (1868–1956), French aviator and industrialist
 Louis Balsan (1911–1982), French bobsledder
 Václav Balšán, Czech racewalker

Other uses
 Balsan (company), French textile manufacturer
 Balsan-dong, neighbourhood of Gangseo-gu in Seoul, South Korea
 Balsan Station, station on the Seoul Subway Line 5

See also
 Balzan (disambiguation)